Gantimur was the ancestor of Russian princely Gantimurov family.

The details of his early life are unknown but it is known that in 1655 he participated with the Qing army in the siege against the Russian fort of Kumarsk. During 1667 Gantimur, along with his relatives and forty elders of his tribe, went over to the Russians to seek an alliance. An immediate attempt made by the Qing authorities to secure his return by force was unsuccessful, and special envoys sent by order of the Kangxi Emperor were also unsuccessful persuading Gantimur to come back to the side of the Qing.

In 1684, Gantimur was baptized as a Christian into the Russian Orthodox Church and entered the ranks of the Russian nobility with the title and name of Prince Peter Gantimurov.

The government in Moscow put him in charge of some of the Tungus and Mongol tribes of the newly acquired Transbaikal region. For permanent residence he chose Nerchinsk. In 1686, he was summoned to Moscow, but died on the way to Narym and was buried in Narym.

References
 

 
Converts to Eastern Orthodoxy from paganism